Shellite may refer to :

An Australian form of Naphtha
Shellite (explosive), British explosive filling for armour-piercing naval shells of the 1920s to 1930s